Wide Hive Records is an independent record label based in Berkeley, California.  It was founded by Gregory Howe in 1997 in San Francisco's Mission District as a record label, live music venue, recording studio and café.

In its early incarnation Wide Hive hosted live acts and recorded, mixed, and mastered CDs of the performances that were available to the audience for purchase at the end of the show.

Since the release of its first record, Dissent, in 1997, Wide Hive has released over thirty titles ranging from jazz to turntablism, downtempo, and funk.  Artists on the label include Phil Ranelin, Calvin Keys, DJ Zeph, MC Azeem, DJ Quest, Harvey Mandel and Larry Coryell. Wide Hive Records had five College Music Journal top ten placements between 2001 and 2010 with DJ Zeph, Variable Unit Seven Grain, Variable Unit Handbook for the Apocalypse, Variable Unit Mayhem Mystics and Wide Hive Players II Guitar, respectively.

References

External links 
 Official site

American independent record labels
Companies based in Berkeley, California
Jazz record labels
Record labels established in 1999
1999 establishments in California